Kirkham is a civil parish in Lancashire, England. It contains 20 buildings that are recorded in the National Heritage List for England as designated listed buildings.  Of these, one is listed at Grade II*, the middle grade, and the others are at Grade II.  The parish contains the town of Kirkham, and most of the listed buildings are houses, churches, commercial buildings, a public house, a school, and associated structures.  The other listed buildings are the fishstones with a lamp standard, a commemorative lamp post, and a telephone kiosk.

Key

Buildings

References

Citations

Sources

Lists of listed buildings in Lancashire
Buildings and structures in the Borough of Fylde